Pietro Bastoni (1570–1622) was a Catholic prelate who served as Bishop of Umbriatico (1611–1622).

Biography
Pietro Bastoni was born in 1570.
On 24 January 1611, he was appointed during the papacy of Pope Paul V as Bishop of Umbriatico.
On 6 February 1611, he was consecrated bishop by Giovanni Garzia Mellini, Cardinal-Priest of Santi Quattro Coronati, with Jullio del Carretto, Bishop of Casale Monferrato, and Antonio d'Aquino, Bishop of Sarno, serving as co-consecrators. 
He served as Bishop of Umbriatico until his death in 1622. 
While bishop, he was the principal co-consecrator of Andrea Pierbenedetti, Bishop of Venosa (1611).

References

External links and additional sources
 (for Chronology of Bishops) 
 (for Chronology of Bishops) 

17th-century Italian Roman Catholic bishops
Bishops appointed by Pope Paul V
1570 births
1622 deaths